Dmitri Ilyich Yugaldin (born 9 August 2002) is a Russian football player who plays for FC Irtysh Omsk on loan from FC Pari Nizhny Novgorod.

Club career
He made his debut in the Russian Football National League for FC Nizhny Novgorod on 30 August 2020 in a game against FC Tekstilshchik Ivanovo.

References

External links
 
 Profile by Russian Football National League
 

2002 births
Sportspeople from Nizhny Novgorod
Living people
Russian footballers
Association football midfielders
FC Nizhny Novgorod (2015) players
FC Irtysh Omsk players
FC Urozhay Krasnodar players
Russian First League players
Russian Second League players